Double demotivation is a theory involving pay and motivation first postulated by S.C. Carr and MacLachlan.
Double demotivation hypothesises that pay discrepancies decrease work motivation among both lower and higher paid individuals who essentially perform the same task. Compared with equitably paid workers, employees who felt they were being under- or overpaid reported lower job satisfaction and greater readiness to change jobs.

See also
 Melvin J. Lerner's just world theory
 J Stacy Adams' equity theory
 Work psychology

References
 Carr S.C., McLoughlin D, .Hodgson M., MacLachlan M (1996) Effects of unreasonable pay discrepancies for under- and overpayment on double demotivation. Genetic and Social General Psychology Monographs. Nov;122(4):475-94.
 McLoughlin, D. and S.C. Carr (1997), Equity Sensitivity and Double De-motivation, Journal of Social Psychology, 137, 668–70. 
 MacLachlan, M. and Carr, S.C. (2005) The Human Dynamics of Aid. Policy Insights, OECD Development Centre, 10, June. Online at: www.oecd.org/dataoecd/35/56/35041556.pdf, accessed on 10 August 2006.
 Carr, S. C., Hodgson, M. R., and Vent, D. H. (2004) Pay Diversity Across Work Groups: A Doubly De-Motivating Influence? Journal of Management Psychology, Vol. 20, No. 5. (May 2005), 417–439.
 http://www.scu.edu/ethics/publications/iie/v3n2/justworld.html

Motivation